Pride of the West is a 1938 American Western film directed by Lesley Selander and written by Nate Watt. The film stars William Boyd, George "Gabby" Hayes, Russell Hayden, Earle Hodgins, Charlotte Field and Billy King. The film was released on July 8, 1938, by Paramount Pictures. Pride of the West was the 17th installment in the Hopalong Cassidy series.

Plot
The Sheriff gets criticised by Caldwell and Nixon for not catching a robbery commanded by themselves and their men, then the Sheriff's daughter Mary, calls for the help of Hoppy who finds the stolen money and has a plan to capture the whole gang.

Cast
 William Boyd as Hopalong Cassidy
 George "Gabby" Hayes as Windy Halliday 
 Russell Hayden as Lucky Jenkins
 Earle Hodgins as Sheriff Martin
 Charlotte Field as Mary Martin
 Billy King as Dick Martin
 Kenneth Harlan as Banker Caldwell
 Glenn Strange as Henchman Saunders
 James Craig as Nixon
 Bruce Mitchell as Detective

References

External links 
 
 
 
 

1938 films
1930s English-language films
American Western (genre) films
1938 Western (genre) films
Paramount Pictures films
Films directed by Lesley Selander
Hopalong Cassidy films
American black-and-white films
1930s American films